Fjoart Jonuzi (born 9 July 1996 in Kukës) is an Albanian professional footballer who plays for KF Vllaznia Shkodër.

He scored 13 goals for FK Kukësi's under-19 side during the 2013–14 season, and a further 7 in the first half of the 2014–15 season.

References

1996 births
Living people
People from Kukës
Association football midfielders
Albanian footballers
Albanian expatriate footballers
Albania youth international footballers
Albania under-21 international footballers
FK Kukësi players
KF Laçi players
SC Gjilani players
KF Vllaznia Shkodër players
Kategoria Superiore players
Football Superleague of Kosovo players
Expatriate footballers in Kosovo
Albanian expatriate sportspeople in Kosovo